National Route 245 is a national highway of Japan connecting Mito and Hitachi in Ibaraki prefecture, with a total length of 42.6 km (26.47 mi).

References

National highways in Japan
Roads in Ibaraki Prefecture